Sir John Coryton, 1st Baronet (c. 1621 – 1680) was an English politician who sat in the House of Commons from 1660 to 1680.

Coryton was the son of William Coryton, of West Newton Ferrers, St Mellion, Cornwall by his wife Elizabeth Chichester, 3rd daughter of Sir John Chichester (died 1586) of Raleigh, Devon, Sheriff of Devon in 1585.

He was baptised on 29 July 1621 at St Mellion. He was fined £297 in 1651. In 1660, he  was elected Member of Parliament for Callington in a by-election to the Convention Parliament. In 1661 he was elected MP for Cornwall in the Cavalier Parliament.  He was created a baronet on  27 February 1662. In February 1679 he was elected MP for Callington again in the First Exclusion Parliament. He was elected MP for Launceston in August 1679 for the Second Exclusion Parliament. 
 
He married twice, firstly on 27 December 1643 at Colebrooke, Devon, to Elizabeth Mills, daughter of John Mills of Colebrooke. She died on 27 September 1667 and was buried in Colebrooke Church, where her mural monument with Corinthian columns and scrollwork pediment survives. By Elizabeth he had 2 sons and 2 daughters. His second marriage, by licence dated 24 May 1680 was to Anne Wayte, a widow, of Acton in Middlesex.

Coryton died at the age of about 58 and was buried at St. Mellion on 23 August 1680. He was succeeded in the baronetcy by his son Sir John Coryton, 2nd Baronet (1648–1690).

References

 

1621 births
1680 deaths
People from Cornwall
Members of the pre-1707 English Parliament for constituencies in Cornwall
English MPs 1660
English MPs 1661–1679
English MPs 1680–1681
Baronets in the Baronetage of England
Burials in Cornwall